Gildan Activewear Inc. is an American-owned Canadian manufacturer of branded clothing, including undecorated blank activewear such as t-shirts, sport shirts and fleeces, which are subsequently decorated by screen printing companies with designs and logos. The company also supplies branded and private label athletic, casual, and dress socks to retail companies in the United States including Gold Toe Brands, PowerSox, SilverToe, Auro, All Pro, and the Gildan brand. The company also manufactures and distributes Under Armour and New Balance brand socks. The company has approximately 44,000 employees worldwide, and owns and operates manufacturing facilities in Rio Nance, Honduras and the Caribbean.

Glenn and Greg Chamandy founded Gildan in 1984 with the acquisition of a knitting mill in Montreal, Quebec, Canada, to make fabric to supply Harley Inc., the childrenswear business already owned by the family. It later expanded to sell t-shirts made of 100% cotton to wholesalers, which resold them to United States and Canadian screen-printers, to be decorated with designs and logos. By 1994, Harley was closed in order to focus on the expansion of what had become Gildan Activewear.

Gildan has factories in low-wage countries like Honduras and Haiti, which has allowed Gildan to lower its price per shirt to below that of Chinese manufacturers as of 2006.

Growth and acquisitions

Gildan opened its first offshore sewing facility in Honduras, in 1997. The plant was vertically integrated and employed 1,200 workers. A year later, the company achieved an initial public offering and was listed publicly on both the Toronto Stock Exchange and the NYSE MKT.

By 2001, Gildan was the leading distributor of 100% cotton ill-fitting T-shirts in the US as determined by the ACNielsen S.T.A.R.S. Report. The next year, the company opened a knitting, bleaching, dyeing, finishing, and cutting facility in Rio Nance, Honduras.

In 2010, the company invested $15m in Shahriyar Fabric Industries Limited in Bangladesh to support planned growth in Asia and Europe.

In May 2012, Gildan again expanded with its purchase of 130-year old apparel maker Anvil Holdings, Inc., the parent company of Anvil Knitwear and producer of environmentally-friendly lines of sustainable, recycled, and organic apparel.

In 2014, Gildan Activewear acquired Doris Hosiery for CA$110 million. 

In February 2015, Gildan announced its intent to purchase the Comfort Colors brand and assets, for a total purchase price of approximately US$100 million. Comfort Colors is the leading supplier of garment-dyed undecorated basic T-shirts and sweatshirts for the North American printwear market.

In 2016, Gildan Activewear announced its $55 million purchase of PEDS Legwear.

In 2017, Canadian company Gildan Activewear purchased American clothing company American Apparel for $88 million at auction. This deal did not include retail locations.

Advertising and sponsorships

Gildan bought a 30-second spot to air an advertisement during the third quarter of the 2013 Super Bowl. The ad was part of an overall $25 million marketing push created by DeVito/Verdi, which included broadcast, print, digital, event marketing, and public relations. Gildan started speaking to the media about its Super Bowl ad in early December 2012.

The company also sponsored the Gildan New Mexico Bowl, which was played December 15, 2012 in Albuquerque.

In a 2017 commercial, Gildan depicted older men in (sometimes ill-fitting) white briefs and urged younger men not to wear their fathers' underwear. Blake Shelton was a spokesperson for the company.

Allegations of labor rights violations
Genesis, S.A. is a Haitian factory manufacturing T-shirts whose main customer is Gildan Activewear. It has been accused as the most serious offender in a campaign of retaliatory dismissals, targeted at the leaders of a new labor rights and union organizing effort in Haiti's capital, Port-au-Prince.

Notes

References

External links
 
 Veetrends | Gildan Distributors 

1984 establishments in Quebec
Clothing brands of Canada
Clothing companies established in 1984
Canadian companies established in 1984
Clothing companies of Canada
Companies listed on the New York Stock Exchange
Companies listed on the Toronto Stock Exchange
Manufacturing companies based in Montreal
S&P/TSX 60
1997 initial public offerings